In Greek mythology, Nausinous  was the son of Odysseus and Calypso. In Theogony by Hesiod, he is said to have a brother named Nausithous.

Mythology 
While stranded on Ogygia, Odysseus was forced to become the lover of Calypso.  According to Hesiod, this union resulted in two sons, named Nausinous and Nausithous.  Neither Nausinous nor his brother are mentioned in Homer's Odyssey.

Notes

References 

 Hesiod, Theogony from The Homeric Hymns and Homerica with an English Translation by Hugh G. Evelyn-White, Cambridge, MA.,Harvard University Press; London, William Heinemann Ltd. 1914. Online version at the Perseus Digital Library. Greek text available from the same website.
 Homer, The Odyssey with an English Translation by A.T. Murray, PH.D. in two volumes. Cambridge, MA., Harvard University Press; London, William Heinemann, Ltd. 1919. . Online version at the Perseus Digital Library. Greek text available from the same website.

Children of Odysseus